The Neptune Caves, also known as the Grottes de l'Adugeoir are a series of natural caves located in Wallonia near Petigny in the municipality of Couvin, Belgium. They are located on the Eau Noire river, a tributary of the Meuse.

Many of the chambers are accessible to the public via a guided tour, partially via boat on the underground river.

References

External links
 

Caves of Wallonia
Show caves in Belgium